The Smuggler-Union Hydroelectric Powerplant, also known as the Bridal Veil Powerhouse, is an electric power generation plant and residence located next to Bridal Veil Falls on a  cliff overlooking Telluride, Colorado. The structure is  stories on a poured concrete foundation with a wood frame superstructure. It consists of a main power plant building, a -story residence and a 1-story cookhouse. The power plant foundation is distinctive, with semicircular windows. A semicircular bay with arched windows projects out on a rock spur.

History
The plant was proposed by Smuggler-Union Mine manager Buckley Wells who lived in the residence as a summer home until the 1920s. It was originally accessed in winter by an aerial tramway but that was eventually destroyed. It operated in its original configuration until its decommissioning in 1953, serving the Idarado Mining Company.

The living quarters and especially the power house/generator fell into disrepair and were heavily vandalized by the time of the historic registry survey in 1979. A local resident, Eric Jacobson, acquired a 99-year lease from the Idarado Mining Company for the property in 1988 and proceeded to restore the facility and eventually moved his family into the residence. The AC plant was restored to operation in 1991 with power being generated by its original 2300 volt Westinghouse Electric AC generator, one of the oldest AC generators still in operation. In 2010 Jacobson gave up the lease to the Idarado Mining Company citing continual regulation and legal problems associated with the site. Idarado has kept the plant in operation and the power generated now provides about 25 percent of Telluride's demand for electricity. As of 2012, the plant generates approximately 2,000 megawatt hours a year – enough electricity to power about 2,000 average American homes, which is purchased from Idarado by the local San Miguel Power Association.

The Smuggler-Union Powerplant was placed on the National Register of Historic Places on December 27, 1979.

References

External links

 Smuggler-Union Hydroelectric Power Plant - coloradoencyclopedia.org
Ames and Smuggler-Union Power Plants at Telluride. Nice photos

Hydroelectric power plants in Colorado
Industrial buildings and structures on the National Register of Historic Places in Colorado
Energy infrastructure completed in 1907
Buildings and structures in San Miguel County, Colorado
1907 establishments in Colorado
National Register of Historic Places in San Miguel County, Colorado
Energy infrastructure on the National Register of Historic Places